Lester Hamilton Kelly (14 February 1892 – 6 January 1958) was an Australian rules footballer who played with the Melbourne University Football Club in the Victorian Football League (VFL).

Family
The son of Rev. Robert Kelly, and Mary Kelly, née Steer, Lester Hamilton Kelly was born at Moonta, South Australia on 14 February 1892.
He married Christina Maude Howard in 1916.

Education
Educated at Wesley College, and the University of Melbourne, he was an outstanding athlete, and was the first Australian schoolboy to high-jump six feet.

At the Wesley College Sports on 21 October 1910, Kelly won the Open shot put (32ft 10in), the open long jump (20ft 8½in), the open 220 yards (23 1/5 secs.), and was second ("by inches") in the open 100 yards.

Football
All of the 40 games he played with University resulted in losses. Kelly played the most games without recording a win of all players in the history of the Victorian Football League.

Military service
He enlisted in the First AIF on 17 August 1914.

Schoolmaster
On his return to Australia, he was a member of the teaching staff at Wesley College.

Death
He died on 6 January 1958.

Footnotes

References 
 Holmesby, Russell & Main, Jim (2007). The Encyclopedia of AFL Footballers. 7th ed. Melbourne: Bas Publishing. 
 World War One Embarkation Roll: Second Lieutenant Lester Hamilton Kelly, collection of the Australian War Memorial.
 World War One Service Record: Captain Lester Hamilton Kelly, National Archives of Australia.
 World War One Nominal Roll: Captain Lester Hamilton Kelly, collection of the Australian War Memorial.
 Great in Sport, Great in War, The Winner, (Wednesday, 22 November 1916), p.6.
 Recent Fighting Described by Prominent Footballers, The Winner, (Wednesday, 22 November 1916), p.6.

External links 
 
 

1892 births
1958 deaths
People from Moonta, South Australia
People educated at Wesley College (Victoria)
Australian male high jumpers
Australian rules footballers from South Australia
University Football Club players
Australian military personnel of World War I
Military personnel from Melbourne
Australian schoolteachers
Wesley College (Victoria)
University of Melbourne alumni sportspeople